Ware is an unincorporated community in  Casey County, Kentucky, United States. Its post office  has ceased to exist.

References

Unincorporated communities in Casey County, Kentucky
Unincorporated communities in Kentucky